The 2nd Washington D.C. Area Film Critics Association Awards, honoring the best in filmmaking in 2003, were given on December 19, 2003.

Winners and nominees
Best Film
 The Lord of the Rings: The Return of the King
 City of God
 Lost in Translation
 Master and Commander: The Far Side of the World
 Mystic River

Best Actor
 Bill Murray – Lost in Translation
 Johnny Depp – Pirates of the Caribbean: The Curse of the Black Pearl
 Chiwetel Ejiofor – Dirty Pretty Things
 Ben Kingsley – House of Sand and Fog
 Sean Penn – Mystic River

Best Actress
 Naomi Watts – 21 Grams
 Cate Blanchett – Veronica Guerin
 Keisha Castle-Hughes – Whale Rider
 Diane Keaton – Something's Gotta Give
 Evan Rachel Wood – Thirteen

Best Supporting Actor
 Benicio del Toro – 21 Grams
 Alec Baldwin – The Cooler
 Tim Robbins – Mystic River
 Peter Sarsgaard – Shattered Glass
 Ken Watanabe – The Last Samurai

Best Supporting Actress
 Anna Deavere Smith – The Human Stain
 Sarah Bolger – In America
 Holly Hunter – Thirteen
 Ludivine Sagnier – Swimming Pool
 Renée Zellweger – Cold Mountain

Best Director
 Peter Jackson – The Lord of the Rings: The Return of the King
 Sofia Coppola – Lost in Translation
 Clint Eastwood – Mystic River
 Fernando Meirelles and Kátia Lund – City of God
 Peter Weir – Master and Commander: The Far Side of the World

Best Ensemble
 Love Actually
 The Lord of the Rings: The Return of the King
 Master and Commander: The Far Side of the World
 A Mighty Wind
 Mystic River

Best Original Screenplay
 Sofia Coppola – Lost in Translation
 Guillermo Arriaga – 21 Grams
 Steven Knight – Dirty Pretty Things
 Andrew Stanton, Bob Peterson, and David Reynolds – Finding Nemo
 Catherine Hardwicke and Nikki Reed – Thirteen

Best Adapted Screenplay
 Brian Helgeland – Mystic River
 Bráulio Mantovani – City of God
 Peter Jackson, Fran Walsh, and Philippa Boyens – The Lord of the Rings: The Return of the King
 Peter Weir and John Collee – Master and Commander: The Far Side of the World
 Billy Ray – Shattered Glass

Best Animated Film
 Finding Nemo
 Brother Bear
 The Triplets of Belleville
 Looney Tunes: Back in Action
 Rugrats Go Wild
Best Documentary Film
 The Fog of War
 Amandla!: A Revolution in Four-Part Harmony
 Capturing the Friedmans
 Step into Liquid
 Tupac: Resurrection

Best Guilty Pleasure
 Pirates of the Caribbean: The Curse of the Black Pearl
 2 Fast 2 Furious
 Charlie's Angels: Full Throttle
 Freaky Friday
 Willard

References

External links
 2003 WAFCA Awards
 2003 WAFCA Awards at IMDB.com
 2003 WAFCA Awards at moviecitynews.com

2003
2003 film awards